Galena Summit is a high mountain pass in the western United States in central Idaho, at an elevation of  above sea level. The pass is located in the Boulder Mountains, in the northwest corner of Blaine County, within the Sawtooth National Recreation Area of the Sawtooth National Forest.

It is the highest summit of a highway in the Northwest. Prior to 1977, Highway 75 was designated U.S. Route 93, which is now to the east on the former U.S. 93 alternate, through Arco and the Lost River Valley.

Galena Summit marks the divide between the Big Wood River and Salmon River drainage areas. It offers views of the Sawtooth range to the northwest and the headwaters of the Salmon River in the Stanley Basin of Custer County, which Highway 75 follows north to Obsidian and Stanley, then east and north towards Challis. The overlook facilities were originally opened in 1964, renamed in 2006 for Frank and Bethine Church, and renovated in 2010.

Collegiate alpine ski races were held on the summit in late 1947, due to a lack of snow at Sun Valley, and supplies were dropped in by airplane. The Ore-Ida Women's Challenge bicycle race (1984–2002) had a stage that crested the summit.

Galena is a mineral, lead sulfide, an important lead ore; deposits of galena often contain silver.

References

External links
Visit Idaho.org - official state tourism site - Galena Summit Overlook
pbase.com - Galena Summit photos
All Sun Valley.com - Galena Summit Overlook
Idaho Transportation Dept. - Division of Highways - mountain passes

Mountain passes of Idaho
Landforms of Blaine County, Idaho
Sawtooth National Forest